John Brockenbrough (1775–1852) was an American business man and civic leader.

John Brockenbrough may also refer to:
 John M. Brockenbrough (1830–1892), American Civil War Confederate officer
 John White Brockenbrough (1806–1877), American federal judge and founder of Washington and Lee University School of Law